J. R. Kealoha (died March 5, 1877) was a Native Hawaiian and a citizen of the Kingdom of Hawaiʻi, who became a Union Army soldier during the American Civil War. Considered one of the "Hawaiʻi sons of the Civil War", he was among a group of more than one hundred documented Native Hawaiian and Hawaiʻi-born combatants who fought in the American Civil War while the Kingdom of Hawaiʻi was an independent nation.

Kealoha enlisted in the 41st United States Colored Infantry, a United States Colored Troops regiment formed in Pennsylvania. Participating in the siege of Petersburg, he and another Hawaiian soldier met the Hawaiʻi-born Colonel Samuel Chapman Armstrong, who recorded their encounter in a letter home. With the 41st USCT, Kealoha was present at the surrender of Confederate General Robert E. Lee and the Army of Northern Virginia at Appomattox Court House on April 9, 1865. After the war, Kealoha returned to Hawaiʻi. He died on March 5, 1877, and was buried in an unmarked grave in Honolulu's Oʻahu Cemetery.

The legacy and contributions of Kealoha and other Hawaiian participants in the American Civil War were largely forgotten except in the private circles of descendants and historians, but in later years there was a revival of interest in the Hawaiian community. In 2010, these "Hawaiʻi sons of the Civil War" were commemorated with a bronze plaque erected along the memorial pathway at the National Memorial Cemetery of the Pacific in Honolulu. In 2014, through another local effort, a grave marker was dedicated over J. R. Kealoha's burial site, which had remained unmarked for 137 years.

Life
After the outbreak of the American Civil War, the Kingdom of Hawaiʻi under King Kamehameha IV declared its neutrality on August 26, 1861. Despite the declaration of neutrality, many Native Hawaiians and Hawaiʻi-born Americans (mainly descendants of American missionaries) abroad and in the islands volunteered and enlisted in the military regiments of various states in the Union and the Confederacy. Participation by Native Hawaiians in American wars was not unheard of. Individual Native Hawaiians had served in the United States Navy and Army since the War of 1812, and even more served during the American Civil War. Many Hawaiians sympathized with the Union because of Hawaiʻi's ties to New England through its missionaries and the whaling industries, and the ideological opposition of many to the institution of slavery.

Nothing is known about the life of J. R. Kealoha before the war. He enlisted in 1864 as a private and was assigned to the 41st Regiment United States Colored Troops (USCT), a colored regiment formed in Camp William Penn, Pennsylvania, between September 30 and December 7, 1864, under the command of Colonel Llewellyn F. Haskell. Most Native Hawaiians who participated in the war were assigned to the colored regiments because of their dark skin color and the segregationist policy in the military at the time. Kealoha is one of the few Hawaiian soldiers of the Civil War whose Hawaiian name is known; many combatants served under anglicized pseudonyms because they were easier for English-speaking Americans to pronounce than Hawaiian language names. They often were registered as kanakas, the nineteenth-century term for Hawaiians and Pacific Islanders, with the "Sandwich Islands" (Hawaiʻi) noted as their place of origin.

From October 1864 to April 1865, Kealoha fought in the Richmond–Petersburg campaign, better known as the siege of Petersburg. During the campaign, Kealoha and another Hawaiian named Kaiwi, of the 28th Regiment United States Colored Troops, came across Samuel Chapman Armstrong, a son of an American missionary posted in Maui. Armstrong wrote of the encounter in a letter home that later, was published in the Hawaiian missionary newspaper The Friend in 1865:
Yesterday, as my orderly was holding my horse, I asked him where he was from. He said he was from Hawaii! He proved to be a full-blood Kanaka, by the name of Kealoha, who came from the Islands last year. There is also another, by the name of Kaiwi, who lived near Judge Smith's, who left the Islands last July. I enjoyed seeing them very much and we had a good jabber in kanaka. Kealoha is a private in the 41st Regiment US Colored Troops, and Kaiwi is a Private in the 28th U.S.C.T., in the pioneer corps. Both are good men and seemed glad to have seen me.

Kealoha survived months of trench warfare during the Richmond–Petersburg campaign and fought with the 41st USCT at the Battle of Appomattox Court House. He was present at the surrender of Confederate General Robert E. Lee and the Army of Northern Virginia at Appomattox Court House on April 9, 1865. The 41st USCT regiment was mustered out of service on November 10, 1865, at Brownsville, Texas, and was discharged December 14, 1865, at Philadelphia. Kealoha's enlistment of service is not present in any existing records or history from the 41st USCT regiment. Historians Justin Vance and Anita Manning speculate that "it is possible that his service is noted under a different name" or his name was never recorded because only the muster-out rolls from the regiment were returned to the Adjutant General's office after the unit disbanded.

After the war, Kealoha returned to Hawaiʻi. He died on March 5, 1877, and was buried with eighteen other Native Hawaiians in an unmarked grave in Section 1, Lot 56 of the Oʻahu Cemetery, Honolulu. During the Hawaii Territorial period, Kealoha's Civil War service was recorded by the United Veterans Service Council (UVSC), a precursor of the United States Department of Veterans Affairs (VA), which included his name in their records as a "Deceased Veteran" and listed the location of his burial.

Memorials

For 137 years, Kealoha's burial site remained unmarked until a Hawaiian group affiliated with the organization Hawaiʻi Civil War Round Table, consisting of Anita Manning, Nanette Napoleon, Eric Mueller, and Justin Vance, started an effort to give him a grave marker. Historian Anita Manning, a member of this group, had discovered the records containing Kealoha's name at the Hawaii State Archives in 2011. It listed his service in the war and the location of his burial place, but when Manning went to the site of his grave, she was disappointed by the absence of a headstone. Giving the reason for the significance of Kealoha's service, Manning stated:

Kealoha represents many Hawaiian men and men from Hawaii who served in the Civil War who knew what they were getting into, who took a risk, and we all are the beneficiaries of that work and risk that they took... We owe it to them to recognize that service.

The group petitioned the United States Department of Veterans Affairs for a marker for Kealoha, but the Department denied the request because there was no next of kin to approve the request. A 2009 policy change enacted in 2012 required that only next of kin could request VA memorials. After the denial of the request, Honor Life Memorials, a local monument maker, donated a granite marker for Kealoha.

The marker was formally dedicated and unveiled on October 25, 2014. Dressed in period costumes, members of the Hawaiʻi Civil War Round Table and others took part in the dedication ceremony at Oʻahu Cemetery. The ceremony was marked by military honors and a gun salute by a unit of Civil War re-enactors. Hawaiian minister Kahu Silva presided over the dedication ceremony, and in accordance with traditional Hawaiian customs, the consecrated marker was adorned with a sacred maile lei and a koa branch, representing "Kealoha's noble qualities of bravery, courage, and valor." The marker is inscribed with his name, regiment, death date, and the Hawaiian and English text: "He Koa Hanohano, a brave and honorable soldier".

Other Hawaiian veterans of the Civil War are honored in Honolulu's National Memorial Cemetery of the Pacific with a bronze memorial plaque that was erected in 2010 in recognition of the "Hawaiʻi sons of the Civil War", the more than one hundred documented Hawaiians who served with the Union and the Confederacy. As of 2014, researchers have identified 119 documented Hawaiian and Hawaiʻi-born combatants from historical records. The exact number remains uncertain because of the lack of records. Of the 48 identified Native Hawaiian combatants, including James Wood Bush and Henry Hoʻolulu Pitman, Kealoha is the only one buried in Hawaii whose gravesite is known. According to Hawaiian news reporter Chelsea Davis, Kealoha has come to "[represent] all the men of Hawaii who took up arms in America's Civil War but who have been forgotten."

See also
 Hawaii and the American Civil War

References

Bibliography
Books and journals
 
 
 
 
 
 
 
 
 
 
 
 

Newspapers and online sources

Further reading

External links
 
 
 

Year of birth missing
1877 deaths
Native Hawaiian people
American military personnel of Native Hawaiian descent
Hawaiian Kingdom people
People of the Hawaiian Kingdom in the American Civil War
People of Pennsylvania in the American Civil War
Union Army soldiers
Burials at Oahu Cemetery